Ilubirin Estate is a public foreshore housing project being built on reclaimed land  in Ikoyi Island,  Lagos  at the foot of the Third Mainland Bridge, facing the Lagos Lagoon waterfront on Lagos Island

Overview
The housing project was initiated by Lagos State Government in partnership with First Investment Property Company through a Public Private Partnership (PPP). The initial design proposal was approved by the Lagos State Ministry of Housing through the Lagos Home Ownership and Mortgage Scheme (LAGOSHOMS). The first phase of Ilubirin was scheduled to be completed in 2019.
Ilubirin was initially modelled after Ikoyi Foreshore Estate, Ikoyi, Lagos and has now been remodelled from a purely residential into a mixed-use development of residential, commercial and leisure areas.

The residential block prototypes that will be completed in the phases are a mixture of 126m2 of 2 bedroom flats; 183m2 of 3 bedroom flats and 76m2 of 1 bedroom flats.

The project site area is approximately 15.1 hectares. Ilubirin aims to combine the benefits of affordable housing  with mid-market luxury.

However, the Lagos State Government was criticized for evicting some of the local residents who lived in proximity to the construction site.

References

External links

Housing estates in Lagos
Mixed-use developments in Lagos
Public housing in Lagos
Buildings and structures under construction in Nigeria